Domaradz may refer to the following places:
Domaradz, Opole Voivodeship (south-west Poland)
Domaradz, Pomeranian Voivodeship (north Poland)
Domaradz, Subcarpathian Voivodeship (south-east Poland)
Domaradz, West Pomeranian Voivodeship (north-west Poland)